Second Hand is a 2005 Romanian film directed by Dan Pița.

Plot summary
The film's plot surrounds the romantic involvement of two contrasting characters: Petre (Mihai Călin), a Mafioso, and Andreea (Alexandra Dinu), a young violin player.  The pair meet and fall in love. Petre becomes obsessed with Andreea and threatens her with violence after she denies his sexual advances.

Cast
Mihai Călin as Petre
Alexandra Dinu as Andreea
Adina Andrei as Mona
Răzvan Oprea as Marian
Bogdan Dumitrescu	
Cătălin Neamṭu
Adina Petras
Laura Vasilescu	
Răzvan Vasilescu

The film also features Răzvan Oprea as Marian, a street thug and close acquaintance of Petre. Marian repeatedly commits crime on behalf of Petre. Both Oprea and Călin are actors within the National Theater in Bucharest.

External links
 
  Răzvan Oprea 
  Mihai Călin

2005 films
2000s Romanian-language films
Films directed by Dan Pița
2005 comedy films
Romanian comedy films